Siah Pelah-ye Ommid Olya (also Romanized as Sīāh Pelah-ye Ommīd ‘Olyā; also known as Seh Ney) is a village in Darb-e Gonbad Rural District, Darb-e Gonbad District, Kuhdasht County, Lorestan Province, Iran. At the 2006 census, its population was 34, in 7 families.

References 

Towns and villages in Kuhdasht County